The Gooikse pijl is a European bicycle race held in and around Gooik, Belgium. Since 2012, the race has been organised as a 1.2 event on the UCI Europe Tour. Since 2018 it is organized as an 1.1 event.

Winners

External links
 Official Website 

UCI Europe Tour races
Cycle races in Belgium
Recurring sporting events established in 2004
2004 establishments in Belgium
Sport in Flemish Brabant